Souk El Bey is one of the souks of the medina of Tunis.

Location 

The souk is near Souk El Berka, Souk Ech-Chaouachine as well as Dar El Bey, which is where the government center is located.

History 
Initiated by Hammuda ibn Ali, it is specialized in trading carpets as well as silk textiles and chachia which was the most important industry in the 19th century.

Products 
Today most traders deal in jewellery and precious stones.

Notes and references 

Bey
Jewellery districts